Jim Mulholland (born in Rockville Centre, New York) is an American television writer and film screenwriter.

Career
At nineteen, he was the youngest writer ever on The Tonight Show Starring Johnny Carson.  He has since won a Writers Guild Award and has received twenty Emmy nominations in the late-night comedy category.  He co-wrote the screenplays for Amazon Women on the Moon, Oscar, The Ratings Game, Bad Boys, and television specials including SCTV comedy special Public Enemy #2.

Filmography
 Favorite Deadly Sins (TV Movie) (segment "Greed") (1995) 
 Bad Boys (1995)
 Public Enemy #2 (1993)
 Basic Values: Sex, Shock & Censorship in the 90's (TV Movie) (1993) 
 Life As We Know It! (TV Movie) (1991)
 Oscar (screenplay) (1991)
 Amazon Women on the Moon (written by) (1987) 
 Many Happy Returns (TV Movie) (1986)
 The Ratings Game (TV Movie) (written by) (1984) 
 Welcome to the Fun Zone (TV Movie) (1984)
 Focus on Fishko (Short) (writer) (1983)
 Likely Stories, Vol. 2 (TV Movie) (1983)
 Likely Stories, Vol. 4 (TV Movie) (1983)
 The Selling of Vince D'Angelo (TV Movie) (1983)

References

External links
 Jim Mulholland at the Internet Movie Database

1949 births
Living people
American television writers
American male screenwriters
American male television writers
People from Rockville Centre, New York
Screenwriters from New York (state)